Viennese Waltz or Johann Strauss, Royal and Imperial Court Musician (German: Johann Strauss, k. u. k. Hofkapellmeister) is a 1932 German historical musical film directed by Conrad Wiene and starring Michael Bohnen, Lee Parry and Paul Hörbiger.

The film's sets were designed by the art directors Wilhelm Depenau, Hans Ledersteger and Karl Machus. It was shot at the Johannisthal Studios in Berlin.

Cast
 Michael Bohnen as Johann Strauß
 Lee Parry as Lilly Dumont 
 Paul Hörbiger as Verleger Haslinger
 Gretl Theimer as Mizzi Enzinger 
 Ekkehard Arendt as Joseph Strauß
 Max Schipper as Tipferl, Ministerialsekretär 
 Anton Pointner as Graf Domsky 
 Fritz Spira as Der Kaiser
 Hanns Waschatko as Minister 
 Fritz Greiner as Theaterdirektor 
 Alfred Abel
 Trude Hesterberg
 Jakob Tiedtke

References

Bibliography 
 Grange, William. Cultural Chronicle of the Weimar Republic. Scarecrow Press, 2008.

External links 
 

1932 films
1930s historical comedy films
German historical comedy films
Films of the Weimar Republic
1930s German-language films
Films directed by Conrad Wiene
Films shot at Johannisthal Studios
Films set in the 19th century
Films set in Vienna
Films shot in Berlin
Films about classical music and musicians
Films about composers
Cultural depictions of Johann Strauss II
1932 comedy films
1930s German films